Planorbidae, common name the ramshorn snails or ram's horn snails, is a family of air-breathing freshwater snails, aquatic pulmonate gastropod molluscs. Unlike most molluscs, the blood of ram's horn snails contains iron-based hemoglobin instead of copper-based hemocyanin. As a result, planorbids are able to breathe oxygen more efficiently than other molluscs. The presence of hemoglobin gives the body a reddish colour. This is especially apparent in albino animals.

Being air breathers like other Panpulmonata, planorbids do not have gills, but instead, have a lung. The foot and head of planorbids are rather small, while their thread-like tentacles are relatively long. Many of the species in this family have coiled shells that are planispiral, in other words, the shells are more or less coiled flat, rather than having an elevated spire as is the case in most gastropod shells. Although they carry their shell in a way that makes it appear to be dextral, the shell of coiled planorbids is in fact sinistral in coiling, but is carried upside down, which makes it appear to be dextral.

General taxonomic context
For several taxa, no consensus exists as to whether the taxa should even be assigned to the family Planorbidae. This is certainly the case with the freshwater limpets Ferrissia, and Ancylus. Both of these genera have sometimes been assigned to the family Lymnaeidae. Alternatively, sometimes each one of them is raised to the level of a family. However, according to the taxonomy of the Gastropoda (Bouchet & Rocroi, 2005), these genera are currently placed in the tribe Ancylini within the family Planorbidae, and that is the taxonomic system that is followed here.

2005 taxonomy

According to the taxonomy of the Gastropoda (Bouchet & Rocroi, 2005), this family consists of the following subfamilies:
 subfamily Planorbinae Rafinesque, 1815
 tribe Planorbini Rafinesque, 1815 - synonyms: Choanomphalinae Fisher & Crosse, 1880; Orygoceratidae Brusina, 1882
 tribe Ancylini Rafinesque, 1815 - synonym: Pseudancylinae Walker, 1923 (inv.)
 tribe Biomphalariini Watson, 1954 - synonyms: Acrorbini Starobogatov, 1958; Drepanothrematini Zilch, 1959; Taphiinae Harry & Hubendick, 1964
 tribe Planorbulini Pilsbry, 1934
 tribe Segmentinini Baker, 1945
 subfamily Bulininae Fischer & Crosse, 1880
 tribe Bulinini Fischer & Crosse, 1880 - synonyms: Laevapicinae Hannibal, 1912; Isidorinae Annandale, 1922; Gundlachiinae Starobogatov, 1967
 tribe Coretini Gray, 1847 - synonyms: Pompholicinae Dall, 1866 (inv.); Camptoceratinae Dall, 1870; Megasystrophinae Tryon, 1871 (inv.); Pompholycodeinae Lindholm, 1927; Helisomatinae Baker, 1928; Bayardellini Starobogatov & Prozorova, 1990; Planorbariini Starobogatov, 1990
 tribe Miratestini Sararsin & Sarasin, 1897 - synonyms: Ferrissiinae Walker, 1917; Ancylastrinae Walker, 1923; Protancylinae Walker, 1923; Physastrinae Starobogatov, 1958; Ameriannini Zilch, 1959; Patelloplanorbidae Franc, 1968
 tribe Plesiophysini Bequaert & Clench, 1939
 subfamily Neoplanorbinae Hannibal, 1912 - synonym: Payettiinae Dall, 1924
 subfamily Rhodacmeinae Walker, 1917

2007 taxonomy for part of the family
Albrecht et al. (2007) analyzed a limited number of genera of Planorbidae, based on sequences of mitochondrial 18S ribosomal DNA and cytochrome-c oxidase I (COI) genes, and on the basis of the results, they rearranged the taxonomy like this:

"A-clade" sensu Albrecht et al. (2007)
 Burnupia Walker, 1912

Tribus Bulinini
 Bulinus Müller, 1781
 Indoplanorbis Annandale, 1921

Tribus Ancylini Rafinesque-Schmaltz, 1815
 Ancylus Müller, 1774
 Ferrissia Walker, 1903
 Gundlachia Pfeiffer, 1849
 Laevapex Walker, 1903
 Hebetancylus Pilsbry, 1914

"B-clade" sensu Albrecht et al. (2007)
 Glyptophysa Crosse, 1872
 Protancylus Sarasin, 1897
 Kessneria Walker & Ponder, 2001
 Leichhardtia Walker, 1988

Tribus Camptoceratini
 Planorbarius Duméril 1806

Tribus Planorbini
 Anisus Studer, 1820
 Bathyomphalus Charpentier, 1837
 Gyraulus Charpentier, 1837
 Hovorbis Brown & Mandahl-Barth, 1973
 Choanomphalus Gerstfeldt, 1859
 Planorbis Müller 1774

Tribus Segmentinini
 Segmentina Fleming, 1818
 Hippeutis Charpentier, 1837
 Polypylis Pilsbry, 1906

"C-Clade" sensu Albrecht et al. (2007)
 Biomphalaria Preston, 1910
 Menetus Adams & Adams, 1855
 Planorbella Haldeman, 1843
 Planorbula Haldeman, 1843

Cladogram
The following is a cladogram that shows the phylogenic relationships within the Planorbidae according to Albrecht 2007:

Genera

The type genus of this family is Planorbis Müller. The following list of genera is organized according to the 2005 taxonomy, because Albrecht's 2007 taxonomy is not available for all genera of Planorbidae.
Genera in the family Planorbidae include (subgenera listed according to Glöer (2002):
 subfamily Planorbinae Rafinesque, 1815

 Anisus S. Studer, 1820
 subgenus Disculifer Boettger, 1944
 Bathyomphalus Charpentier, 1837
 Gyraulus Charpentier, 1837
 subgenus Torquis Dall, 1905
 subgenus Lamorbis Starobogatov, 1967
 subgenus Armiger Hartmann, 1843
 Hippeutis Charpentier, 1837
 tribe Ancylini Rafinesque, 1815
 Ancylus Müller, 1773 - type genus of tribe Ancylini
 tribe Biomphalariini Watson, 1954
 Biomphalaria Preston, 1910 - type genus of tribe Biomphalariini
 Drepanotrema Crosse & Fischer, 1880
 tribe Planorbini Rafinesque, 1815
 Afrogyrorbis Starobogatov, 1967
 Planorbis Müller, 1773
 tribe Planorbulini Pilsbry, 1934
 Planorbula Haldeman, 1840 - type genus of tribe Planorbulini
 tribe Segmentinini Baker, 1945
 Segmentina Fleming, 1818 - type genus of tribe Segmentinini
 subfamily Bulininae Fischer & Crosse, 1880
 Indoplanorbis Annandale & Prashad, 1920 - contains one species Indoplanorbis exustus
 Planorbarius Duméril, 1806
 Planorbella Haldeman, 1842
 Menetus Adams & Adams, 1855
 subgenus Dilatata Clessin, 1885
 tribe Bulinini Fischer & Crosse, 1880
 Bulinus Müller, 1781 - type genus of subfamily Bulininae
 Gundlachia Pfeiffer, 1849
 tribe Coretini Gray, 1847
 Coretus Gray, 1847 - type genus of tribe Coretini
 tribe Miratestini Sarasin & Sarasin, 1897
 Miratesta Sarasin & Sarasin, 1897 - type genus of tribe Miratestini
 Amerianna Strand, 1928
 Ferrissia Walker, 1903
 Pettancyclus Iredale, 1943
 tribe Plesiophysini Bequaert & Clench, 1939
 Plesiophysa Fischer, 1883 - type genus of tribe Plesiophysini
 subfamily Neoplanorbinae Hannibal, 1912
 Neoplanorbis Pilsbry, 1906 - type genus of subfamily Neoplanorbinae
 subfamily Rhodacmeinae Walker, 1917
 Rhodacmea Walker, 1917 - type genus of subfamily Rhodacmeinae

Subfamily = ? (other genera that are not yet sorted are listed here)
 Acrorbis Odhner, 1937
 Africanogyrus Özdikmen & Darilmaz, 2007 - synonym: Afrogyrus Brown & Mandahl-Barth, 1973
 Afroplanorbis Thiele, 1931
 Amphigyra Pilsbry, 1906
 Anisopsis Sandberger, 1875
 Antillorbis Harry & Hubendick, 1964
 Armigerus Clessin, 1884
 Australorbis Pilsbry, 1934
 Bayardella Burch, 1977
 Berellaia Laubrière & Carez, 1880
 Camptoceras Benson, 1843
 Camptoceratops Wenz, 1923
 Carinifex Binney, 1865
 Carinogyraulis Polinski, 1929
 Ceratophallus Brown & Mandahl-Barth, 1973
 Choanomphalus Gerstfeldt, 1859
 Culmenella Clench, 1927
 Fossulorbis Pilsbry, 1934
 Glyptophysa Crosse, 1872
 Helicorbis Benson, 1855
 Helisoma Swainson, 1840
 Intha Annandale, 1922
 Isidorella Tate, 1896
 Kessneria Walker & Ponder, 2001
 Leichhardtia Walker, 1988
 Lentorbis Mandahl-Barth, 1954
 Macrophysa (Meek) Dall, 1870
 Paraplanorbis Hanna, 1922
 Patelloplanorbis Hubendick, 1957
 Pecosorbis Taylor, 1985
 Pentagoniostoma Branson, 1935
 Perrinilla Hannibal, 1912
 Physastra Tapparone-Canefri, 1883
 Physopsis Krauss, 1848
 Pingiella Baker, 1945
 Pitharella Edwards, 1860
 Planorbifex Pilsbry, 1935
 Planorbina Haldeman, 1842
 Platyphysa Fischer, 1883
 Platytaphius Pilsbry, 1924
 Polypylis Pilsbry, 1906
 Promenetus Baker, 1935
 Protancylus Sarasin & Sarasin, 1897
 Pygmanisus Iredale, 1943
 Segmentorbis Mandahl-Barth, 1954
 Sineancylus Gutiérrez Gregoric, 2014
 Syrioplanorbis Baker, 1945
 Trochorbis Benson, 1855
 Vorticifex Meek in Dall, 1870

The genus Camptoceratops Wenz, 1923 is no longer considered to be a planorbid. It was recognised by Curry (1965, p. 360) as a euthecosomatous pteropod (Heterobranchia) (note by Arie W. Janssen, 092507).

The generic name Taphius Adams & Adams, 1855 is a synonym for Biomphalaria.

Shell description

The shells of most species in this family are disk-like or button-like, being coiled in one plane, although several groups have shells that are more higher-spired, and some are limpet-like.

All coiled shell Planorbidae are sinistral in their shell coiling, as is proved by their internal anatomy (the respiratory and the genital orifice are situated on the left side), however the animals carry their shells with what would normally be the ventral (i.e. umbilical) surface uppermost, and because of this, the shells appear to be dextral.

Indeed, formerly planorbids were thought to have dextral shells, and so species of this family were figured as if they had dextral shells. Although it is now understood that these species are sinistral in shell coiling, disk-like Planorbid shells are often still shown in illustrations oriented as if they were dextral.

Most species of coiled planorbids have a rather thin and moderately smooth shell, although more distinct sculpture such as a keel occurs in, and is diagnostic of, certain species. In the flat, keeled species, the whorls tend to overlap.

The aperture has a sharp outer lip. A peristome can be present, but often the lip is not thickened nor reflected. Those planorbid species which have a high-spired shell may have a narrow umbilicus, but frequently this is covered by callus.

In height most species vary between 6 mm and 6 cm, however, disk-like shells are usually less than about 2 cm in maximum dimension.

Like all pulmonate aquatic snails, ramshorn shells do not have an operculum to close the shell aperture.

Sinistral shells

Flat-coiled planorbid gastropod shells are hard to understand in terms of their coiling and orientation. Many of the shells of species in this family are almost planispiral in coiling such that one side of the shell often looks rather like the other side, but it is important to bear in mind that nonetheless there is an umbilical side and a spire side of the shell. In addition these are in fact sinistral shells, despite the fact that the snail carries its shell as if it were a normal dextral shell. To make sense of the shell coiling, the following facts are useful:
 In life, these pond snails hold their shells upside down compared to the normal gastropod shell orientation, with the umbilicus facing upwards.
 The spire of the shell is quite sunken in many species. In addition, it is carried facing downwards.
 The umbilicus of the shell is very wide and shallow.
 In some species the umbilicus is not as deeply "dished" as the sunken spire is, so superficially it can be hard to tell one from the other.

However, once it is understood that the planorbid shell is sinistral, if the shell is held with the aperture on the left and facing the observer, then the sunken spire side of the shell is uppermost. This is a convenience for understanding the shell, but is the opposite of the way the shell is actually carried in life.

The side of the shell which is in fact the spire (a sunken spire) faces down in the living animal, contrary to what is the case in almost all other shelled gastropods. Because the shell is carried "upside down" like this, the aperture of the shell is angled to face downwards also, so the aperture faces a little towards the spire, not away from it, as is usually the case in other shelled gastropods.

Habitat
Most species of planorbids live only in fresh water, such as ponds, lakes, and slow moving rivers. A minority of species are able to survive in brackish water.

Geological history
Ancestors of ramshorn snails are known with certainty since the Jurassic period. Modern taxa developed in the Jurassic.

Geographical distribution
Species in this family occur worldwide. In Northwest Europe about 20 species are known (including non-indigenous species). In this region, various extinct taxa are known to have occurred, starting in the Jurassic period.

References

  Gittenberger, E., Janssen, A.W., Kuijper, W.J., Kuiper, J.G.J., Meijer, T., Velde, G. van der & Vries, J.N. de (1998) De Nederlandse zoetwatermollusken. Recente en fossiele weekdieren uit zoet en brak water Nederlandse Fauna 2. Nationaal Natuurhistorisch Museum Naturalis, KNNV Uitgeverij & EIS-Nederland, Leiden, 288 pp.
  Fischer, P.H. (1880-1887) Manuel de Conchyliologie et de Paléontologie conchyliologique ou histoire naturelle des Mollusques vivants et fossiles suivi d'un appendice sur les Brachiopodes par D. Oehlert. – XXIV + 1369 pp.
 (German) Thiele, J. (1929-1935) Handbuch der Systematischen Weichtierkunde. Jena, (1), 1-376, 1929; (2), 377-778, 1931; 779-1022, 1934; 1023-1134, 1935.
  Vaught, K.C. (1989) A classification of living mollusca. American Malacologists Inc., Melbourne USA,  & 0-915826-22-6, 195 pp.
 (German) Wenz, W. (1923-1930) Gastropoda extramarina tertiaria. Fossilium Catalogus I. (4 vols.), 3387 pp.
 (German) Zilch, A. (1959-1960) Euthyneura. In: H. Schindewolf (ed.), Handbuch der Paläozoologie, 6(2): pp. I-XII + 1-834.

External links

  NCBI Taxonomy Browser: Planorbidae
  Systema naturae 2000 (classification) - Taxon: Planorbidae
  ITIS: Planorbidae
  http://mkohl1.net/Planorbidae.html
 Frank Collins Baker, The Molluscan Family Planorbidae, The University of Illinois press, Urbana, 1945

 
Gastropod families
Taxa named by Constantine Samuel Rafinesque